is a Japanese company specializing in steel, particularly automobile and industrial components. Its main products are steel products; wheels for passenger cars, buses, trucks and construction machinery; and undercarriage components for construction equipment.

The company has production sites in Japan, US, China, Mexico and Thailand and is an OEM wheel supplier to a number of car manufacturers such as Honda, Nissan, Ford, General Motors, Subaru, Kia and Chrysler. In the past Topy Industries was part of the Fuyo Group keiretsu.

References

External links
 Official global website 

Steel companies of Japan
Robotics companies of Japan
Manufacturing companies based in Tokyo
Companies listed on the Tokyo Stock Exchange
Manufacturing companies established in 1921
Auto parts suppliers of Japan
Wheel manufacturers
Japanese brands
Japanese companies established in 1921